Al-Makir al-Lagh is a sub-district located in Khwlan District, Sana'a Governorate, Yemen. Al-Makir al-Lagh had a population of 2601 according to the 2004 census.

References 

Sub-districts in Khwlan District